Donald Robert Perry Marquis (July 29, 1878 – December 29, 1937) was an American humorist, journalist, and author. He was variously a novelist, poet, newspaper columnist, and playwright. He is remembered best for creating the characters Archy and Mehitabel, supposed authors of humorous verse. During his lifetime he was equally famous for creating another fictitious character, "the Old Soak," who was the subject of two books, a hit Broadway play (1922–23), a silent film (1926) and a talkie (1937).

Life
Marquis was born and grew up in Walnut, Illinois. His brother David died in 1892 at the age of 20; his father James died in 1897. After graduating from Walnut High School in 1894, he attended Knox Academy, a now-defunct preparatory program run by Knox College, in 1896, but left after three months.

In 1909, Marquis married Reina Melcher, with whom he had a son, Robert (1915–1921) and a daughter, Barbara (1918–1931). 

Reina died on December 2, 1923, and three years later Marquis married the actress Marjorie Potts Vonnegut, whose first husband, actor Walter Vonnegut, was a cousin of Kurt Vonnegut Jr., the bestselling author, playwright and satirist. Marjorie died in her sleep on October 25, 1936.

Marquis died of a stroke in New York City, after suffering three other strokes that partly disabled him.

Career
From 1902 to 1907 Marquis served on the editorial board of the Atlanta Journal where he wrote many editorials during the heated gubernatorial election between his publisher Hoke Smith and future Pulitzer Prize winner, Clark Howell (Smith was the victor).

In 1912 he began work for the New York Evening Sun, and edited for the next eleven years a daily column, "The Sun Dial". In 1922 he left The Evening Sun (shortened to The Sun in 1920) for the New York Tribune (renamed the New York Herald Tribune in 1924), where his daily column, "The Tower" (later "The Lantern") was a great success. He regularly contributed columns and short stories to the Saturday Evening Post, Collier's and American magazines and also appeared in Harper's, Scribner's, Golden Book, and Cosmopolitan.

Marquis's best-known creation was Archy, a fictional cockroach (developed as a character during 1916) who had been a free-verse poet in a previous life, and who supposedly left poems on Marquis's typewriter by jumping on the keys. Archy usually typed only lower-case letters, without punctuation, because he could not operate the shift key. His verses were a type of social satire, and were used by Marquis in his newspaper columns titled "archy and mehitabel"; mehitabel was an alley cat, occasional companion of archy and the subject of some of archy's verses. The archy and mehitabel pieces were illustrated by cartoonist George Herriman, better known to posterity as the author of the newspaper comic Krazy Kat. Other characters developed by Marquis included Pete the Pup, Clarence the ghost, and an egomaniacal toad named Warty Bliggins.

Marquis was the author of about 35 books. He co-wrote (or contributed posthumously to) the films The Sports Pages, Shinbone Alley, The Good Old Soak and Skippy. The 1926 film The Cruise of the Jasper B was supposedly based on his 1916 novel of the same name, although the plots have little in common.

Publications

1912: Danny's Own Story (novel)
1915: Dreams & Dust (poems)
1916: The Cruise of the Jasper B. (novel)
1916: Hermione and Her Little Group of Serious Thinkers (sketches)
1919: Prefaces (essays)
1921: The Old Soak and Hail and Farewell (sketches) Dramatized 1921, 1926, 1937.
1921: Carter and Other People (short stories)
1921: Noah an' Jonah an' Cap'n John Smith (poems, sketches)
1922: Poems and Portraits (poems)
1922: Sonnets to a Red-Haired Lady and Famous Love Affairs (poems)
1922: The Revolt of the Oyster (short stories)
1924: The Dark Hours (play) This play about the trial, passion and crucifixion of Jesus premiered on 14 March 1932 at the Maryland Theatre in Baltimore, Maryland. Bretaigne Windust directed the University Players with a cast of more than 50, which included Joshua Logan as Caiaphas, Charles Crane Leatherbee as Pilate, Henry Fonda as Peter, and Kent Smith as Jesus. The play subsequently opened on Broadway on 14 November 1932 and ran 8 performances.
1924: Pandora Lifts the Lid (novel)
1924: Words and Thoughts (play)
1924: The Awakening (poems)
1927: Out of the Sea (play)
1927: The Almost Perfect State (essays)
1927: archy and mehitabel (poems, sketches)
1928: Love Sonnets of a Cave Man (poems)
1928: When the Turtles Sing (short stories)
1929: A Variety of People (short stories)
1930: Off the Arm (novel)
1933: archys life of mehitabel (poems, sketches)
1934: Master of the Revels (play)
1934: Chapters for the Orthodox (short stories)
1935: archy does his part (poems, sketches)
1936: Sun Dial Time (short stories)
1939: Sons of the Puritans (novel)
1940: the lives and times of archy and mehitabel (omnibus)
1946: The Best of Don Marquis (omnibus)
1978: Everything's Jake (play)
1982: Selected Letters of Don Marquis (letters) Edited by William McCollum Jr.
1996: archyology (poems, sketches) Edited by Jeff Adams.
1998: archyology ii (poems, sketches) Edited by Jeff Adams.
2006: The Annotated Archy and Mehitabel (poems, sketches) Edited by Michael Sims.

See also

Franklin Pierce Adams
Heywood Broun
Christopher Morley

References

Sources
 "Humor’s sober side: Being an interview with Don Marquis, another of a series on how humorists get that way by Josephine van der Grift," Bisbee Daily Review, October 13, 1922, p. 4.

Further reading
O Rare Don Marquis by Edward Anthony, published 1962 by Doubleday.

External links

 
 
 
 Essays by Don Marquis at Quotidiana.org
 Don Marquis.org
 Don Marquis.com
 
 
 
 
 
 Finding aid to Don Marquis papers at Columbia University. Rare Book & Manuscript Library.

American cartoonists
American columnists
American humorists
American humorous poets
American male dramatists and playwrights
20th-century American poets
1878 births
1937 deaths
Knox College (Illinois) alumni
People from Bureau County, Illinois
People from Walnut, Illinois
Poets from Illinois
Journalists from Illinois
20th-century American non-fiction writers
20th-century American male writers